The Kalispell Monumental Company, at 7 First Ave. E. in Kalispell, Montana, was built in 1911.  It was listed on the National Register of Historic Places in 1994.

It was built to serve as a tombstone and monument retail company store, as a branch of Spokane's Sammis
Monumental Company.  Because it would receive and process marble and other stone blocks, being located next to a railway was necessary.

It was designed by Kalispell architect Joseph Gibson and was built at cost of $12,000.

It later served as Main Street Motors and as Glory Day Emporium.

References

National Register of Historic Places in Flathead County, Montana
Commercial buildings completed in 1911
Kalispell, Montana
1911 establishments in Montana
Commercial buildings on the National Register of Historic Places in Montana
Death in Montana
Monumental masonry companies